Cham Qaleh (also Romanized as Cham Qal‘eh; also known as Cham Qal‘eh-ye Pā’īn) is a village in Bazoft-e Pain Rural District of Bazoft District, Kuhrang County, Chaharmahal and Bakhtiari province, Iran. At the 2006 census, its population was 891 in 134 households. The following census in 2011 counted 1,077 people in 200 households. The latest census in 2016 showed a population of 1,469 people in 309 households; it was the largest village in its rural district. The village is populated by Lurs.

References 

Kuhrang County

Populated places in Chaharmahal and Bakhtiari Province

Populated places in Kuhrang County

Luri settlements in Chaharmahal and Bakhtiari Province